Prosper Bazombanza (born 1959/1960) is a Burundian politician serving as Vice President of Burundi since 23 June 2020. He was appointed to the position by newly elected president Évariste Ndayishimiye. He previously also served as First Vice President from 2014 to 2015.

Career
Prior to his appointment as vice president, Bazombanza served as director general of the National Social Security Institute from 2016 to 2017, and as secretary-general of the Insurance Regulatory and Control Agency. On June 23, 2020, he was appointed to the post of vice president, replacing First Vice President Gaston Sindimwo following the creation of a single vice presidency.

References

Vice-presidents of Burundi
20th-century births
Year of birth uncertain
Living people